This is a comparison of word processing software.

General information
This table provides general information about selected word processors.

Characteristics
This table gives characteristics of each word processor.

Operating system compatibility 
This table shows the operating systems supported by the latest word processor version

Import or open capabilities 
This table gives a comparison of the file formats each word processor can import or open.

Export or save capabilities 
This table gives a comparison of the file formats each word processor can export or save. In some cases, omitting an Export format (Microsoft Word's omission of WordPerfect export is the best known example) was a sales rather than a technical measure.

See also
 List of word processors
 Comparison of spreadsheet software
 Comparison of text editors
 Comparison of TeX editors
 Comparison of office suites
 Office suite
 Online office suite

Notes

References

Word processors

Word processors